Ivan John Petch (born 1 March 1939) is a former Australian politician. Petch was a member of the New South Wales Legislative Assembly representing the electorate of Gladesville for the Liberal Party between 1988 and 1995. He served as a Councillor for the Ryde City Council including a term as Mayor between 2012 and 2013.

Background and early career
Born in Concord, New South Wales, Petch attended Putney Primary School and Fort Street Boys High School before receiving his tertiary education in electrical engineering and music at Sydney Technical College. He held various positions, including professional musician, electrical engineering consultant, company managing director (Independent Promotions Pty Ltd), and a licensed electrical contractor. He joined the Liberal Party in 1975.

Political career
In 1977, Petch was elected to Ryde Municipal Council, and from 1980–87 he also sat on Sydney County Council, of which he was chairman in 1984 and 1985. From 1984–87 he was an executive member of the Local Government Association. He was active in the Ryde local area as Chairman of the Ryde "Red Cross Calling" Appeal 1978–84, President of the Ryde Lions Club 1985–86, and honorary member of the North Ryde Rotary Club, from which he received a Paul Harris Fellow award. He was also appointed a Knight of the Order of St Lazarus of Jerusalem.

In 1988, Petch was elected to the New South Wales Legislative Assembly as the Liberal member for Gladesville. He held the seat until 1995, when he was defeated by Labor candidate and future Deputy Premier John Watkins. 
Gladesville was later abolished in 1999 and replaced by Ryde and Petch contested the 1999 and 2007 state elections as an independent candidate for Ryde, but was defeated both in a rematch against Watkins.

Corruption 
On 30 June 2014, the Independent Commission Against Corruption issued findings that Petch had acted corruptly during his 2012/13 term as Mayor. Petch rejected the findings, confirming he was launching legal action in the NSW Supreme Court and said it "beggars belief" that ICAC could accuse him of acting corruptly "after 37 years of representing the residents honestly and sincerely". On 28 November 2014, the Supreme Court of New South Wales dismissed Petch's challenge. Petch resigned from the Ryde City Council with effect from 1 December 2014.

In October 2018, a 12 person jury found Petch guilty of "making an unwarrranted demand with menaces" while he was Ryde mayor in May 2013, by suggesting the council's then acting general manager might not get a permanent job unless she made a decision favouring his financial interests.  He avoided jail time but will serve a supervised two-year corrections order in the community. NSW District Court Judge Nicole Noman said on Monday the former mayor's behaviour conveyed "a sense of entitlement" and a "preparedness to manipulate others for his advantage".

The NSW Court of Criminal Appeal on 19 June 2020 quashed his conviction and entered a verdict of acquittal. Mr Petch, who is also a former state MP, was accused of telling the then-acting council general manager Danielle Dickson to settle a court costs case in a way favourable to him as she would need his help to permanently retain her position. The appeal court found the trial judge erred by admitting evidence of Ms Dickson as to her opinion of Mr Petch's state of mind when he uttered the words found to amount to an attempt at blackmail. In quashing the conviction, the court considered whether to order a re-trial, noting the public interest in prosecuting people who allegedly used their high public office to commit an offense. But Justices Clifton Hoeben, Peter Hamill and Richard Cavanagh said the case had unusual and compelling features. Mr Petch was now 80, there had been a five-year delay in bringing him to trial and he had already served more than three-quarters of the intensive corrections order. "By the time of any retrial, eight or nine years will have elapsed since the offence was allegedly committed," Justice Hamill said.

References

 

1939 births
Living people
Liberal Party of Australia members of the Parliament of New South Wales
Politicians from Sydney
Members of the New South Wales Legislative Assembly
Mayors of Ryde
Councillors of Sydney County Council